Route 220A, also known as Creston Boulevard, is a short  north–south highway located entirely in the town of Marystown on the island of Newfoundland. It connects the Creston neighbourhood of town with the downtown area. Route 220A also represents the former alignment of Route 220 prior to its realignment onto the Creston Causeway.

Route description

Route 220A begins at an intersection/partial interchange in Creston with Route 220 (Creston Boulevard/Creston Causeway). It heads northeast through neighbourhoods for a few kilometres, where it has an intersection with Marine Drive (which provides access to Little Bay and Beau Bois), before crossing a bridge over a river into downtown. The highway immediately has an interchange with Ville Marie Drive before passing by a few businesses and coming to an end at an intersection with Route 210 (Columbia Drive/McGettigan Boulevard).

Major intersections

References

220A